is a 1969 Japanese cel-animated action-comedy musical film produced by Tōei Animation (then Tōei Dōga) and the second film to be directed by Kimio Yabuki. The screenplay and lyrics, written by Hisashi Inōe and Morihisa Yamamoto, is based on the European literary fairy tale of the same name by Charles Perrault, expanded with elements of Alexandre Dumas-esque swashbuckling adventure and cartoon animal slapstick, with many other anthropomorphic animals (kemono in Japanese) in addition to the title character. The Tōei version of the character himself is named Pero, after Perrault. It is the 15th film that Tōei Dōga produced.

The film was released straight to television in the United States by AIP-TV.

The film is particularly notable for giving Toei Animation its mascot and logo and for its roll call of top key animators of the time: Yasuo Ōtsuka, Reiko Okuyama, Sadao Kikuchi, Yōichi Kotabe, Akemi Ōta, Hayao Miyazaki and Akira Daikubara, supervised by animation director Yasuji Mori and given a relatively free rein and adequate support to create virtuosic and distinctive sequences, making it a key example of the Japanese model of division of labour in animation by which animators are assigned by scene rather than character. Most famous of these sequences is a chase across castle parapets animated in alternating cuts by Ōtsuka and Miyazaki which would serve as the model for similar sequences in such later films as Miyazaki's feature-directing début The Castle of Cagliostro and The Cat Returns. Miyazaki is also the manga artist of a promotional comic book adaptation of the film originally serialised in the Sunday Chūnichi Shimbun during 1969, in which it is credited to Tōei Dōga as a whole, and republished in 1984 in a book about the making of the film. The film was re-released 9 years later in the 1978 Summer Toei Manga Matsuri on July 22.

Since becoming Toei Animation's mascot, Pero's face can be seen on the company's primary logo at the beginning or ending to some of Toei's other animated features, both from Japan and some of their outsourced work for other companies. In 2016, a new 3D on-screen logo featuring Pero was revealed in celebration of the company's 60th anniversary. The 3D on-screen logo without the 60th Anniversary wordmark and the company's motto was used since 2019. The former on-screen logo is currently used as a print logo.

Cast

Plot
The enigmatic Puss, Pero, is declared an outlaw by his feline home village for saving mice, an act that defies the nature of cats and is therefore illegal. After Pero escapes to avoid punishment, the Feline King dispatches three bumbling assassins to find and capture Pero, warning them that they face execution should they fail. Pero begins his journey, (all the while dodging his would-be captors throughout the adventure) soon meeting young Pierre, a poor, neglected miller's son who is ousted from his home. The two quickly become good friends and set off together across the countryside. They eventually arrive at a bustling kingdom where a ceremony has begun in which to select a suitable prince who shall wed the lonely, innocent Princess Rosa. Pero sees potential in Pierre as the perfect candidate and hurries into the castle to begin his plan, much to Pierre's opposition. Misfortune soon enshrouds the kingdom as Lucifer, an ogre sorcerer, appears displaying his awesome magical abilities with promises of power and riches if Rosa becomes his bride. Despite the King's excited willingness, Rosa sternly declines Lucifer's offer which enrages him with disappointment. He threatens the King with a terrifying demonstration of the darkness that will befall his country if Rosa is not surrendered to him in three days time. Pero, now dumbfounded, witnesses this shocking event and what was once a simple mission of persuasion has now become more than he ever bargained for.

Release
The film was released in Japan theatrically on March 18, 1969.

The AIP English dub version was first released on VHS twice, first by Vestron Video in 1982 (under licensed from then-owner Orion Pictures) and by Media Home Entertainment in 1985, then by Hi-Tops Video. In 2006, Discotek Media has released a DVD version of the film containing the original Japanese version with English subtitles, the AIP English dub, and a music and effects track in Region 1 NTSC format in the United States, under the title The Wonderful World of Puss 'n Boots. On December 2, 2020, Toei released the film on Blu-ray in Japan.

Reception
The film placed 58th in a list of the 150 best animated films and series of all time compiled by Tokyo's Laputa Animation Festival from an international survey of animation staff and critics in 2003.

Manga
Hayao Miyazaki created a 12-chapter manga series as a promotional tie-in for the film. The series was printed in colour and ran in the Sunday edition of Tokyo Shimbun, from January to March 1969. The series was released in pocket book form by Tokuma Shoten in February 1984.

Sequels
The 1969 Puss 'n Boots was followed by two sequels.

The Three Musketeers in Boots
The second film, the misleadingly-titled  (1972), actually departs from the Dumasian Europe of the first for a Western setting and was released on VHS in the early 1980s in the United States by MPI Home Video as Ringo Rides West and in the United Kingdom by Mountain Video as Ringo Goes West, with Pero renamed to Ringo for its English dub. It is also marketed by Tōei as Return of Pero and popularly known today as The Three Musketeers in Boots, despite the film featuring no musketeers, as the setting is the American Old West.

Puss 'n Boots Travels Around the World
The third,  (1976), was licensed by Turner Program Services and given a dub where Pero is renamed Pussty and was directed by Peter Fernandez. The dub was released on video in the US by RCA/Columbia Pictures Home Video.

The film was a major success in the Soviet Union, drawing 42.4million admissions at the Soviet box office. This was equivalent to approximately million Rbls.

The video game Nagagutsu o Haita Neko: Sekai Isshū 80 Nichi Dai Bōken is based on this third film and was also released, in a heavily revised version, in the United States under the title Puss 'n Boots: Pero's Great Adventure, where it is better known than the film itself. The game was released for the Famicom in Japan and was later released outside of Japan for the Nintendo Entertainment System. The game and its plot, based on the third film, was used as a plot in one of the episodes of the second season of Captain N: The Game Master, entitled "Once Upon A Time Machine", which have re-designs of Pero and the two villains of the film, Count Gourmon (Gruemon in the game's instruction manual) and Dr. Garigari. Dr. Garigari had actually appeared a decade before in 1965 as the antagonist to Toei's animated TV series Hustle Punch and was recycled to be used in this film.

Dream short film
In 2018, Toei produced a 6 minute short film entitled Dream, where a young boy dreams about whales as well as Pero who also appears in the dream. This version of Pero has small black eyes, but that was to match the animation style of the short.

References

Sources

External links
 Puss 'n Boots at Tōei Animation's corporate website 
 Nagagutsu o Haita Neko at Tōei Animation's Japanese website 
 
 
 
 

1969 films
1969 anime films
1972 films
1972 anime films
1976 films
1976 anime films
1960s action films
1970s action films
1969 comedy films
1972 comedy films
1960s fantasy films
1970s fantasy films
1960s musical films
1970s musical films
Animated films about cats
Anime and manga based on fairy tales
Japanese film series
Films based on Puss in Boots
Toei Animation films
Toei Company films
Animated comedy films
Animated musical films
Japanese comedy films
Japanese musical films
Discotek Media
Japanese animated fantasy films
Japanese fantasy adventure films
1976 comedy films
1960s children's animated films
Films directed by Kimio Yabuki